Montendre is a commune in the Charente-Maritime department in southwestern France.

Population
In 1972 Montendre absorbed the former communes Chardes and Vallet.

See also
 Communes of the Charente-Maritime department

References

External links
 

Communes of Charente-Maritime
County of Saintonge